Lee Seung-jun or Lee Seung-joon is the name of:

 Lee Seung-joon (actor born 1973), South Korean actor
 Lee Seung-joon (actor born 1978), South Korean actor
 Lee Seung-jun (basketball) (born 1978), South Korean basketball player
 Lee Seung-Jun (member of a South Korean boy group ONF)